The Old US 41–Backwater Creek Bridge is a bridge located on an abandoned section of US Highway 41 (US 41) over Backwater Creek in Baraga Township, Michigan. It was listed on the National Register of Historic Places in 1999.

History
In 1913, the state of Michigan authorized the construction of trunkline roads through the state. A main trunkline route through Baraga County was designated, extending from Michigamme to Chassell. By 1915, the trunkline had been completed, and the Baraga County Road Commission spent the remainder of the decade slowly improving the route, regrading segments and replacing some bridges.

The Michigan State Highway Department designed a long-span pony truss bridge for the crossing, designated State Trunk Line Bridge No. 86. In 1917, the department awarded contracts for the construction of the bridge: Smith-Sparks Construction Company was awarded $5,414.20 to fabricate the concrete substructure, and the Northwestern Bridge and Iron Company fabricated and installed the truss for $4,536.00. The structure was completed in 1918.

In 1926, the trunkline road was incorporated into US 41. Traffic along the route increased, and eventually a replacement bridge was built nearby. The original bridge remains, in essentially unaltered condition, and is now a privately owned structure.

Description
The deck is constructed of I-beams bolted to the verticals and support stringers, over which a concrete roadway is laid. The trusses are supported by concrete abutments on all four corners, having angled wingwalls.

The bridge is historically important as an early part of the region's infrastructure, and is technologically noteworthy as one of the earliest examples of a standard highway department pony truss design in the state.

See also
 
 
 
 
 List of bridges on the National Register of Historic Places in Michigan
 National Register of Historic Places listings in Baraga County, Michigan

References

External links
Old US 41–Backwater Creek Bridge at HistoricBridges.org

Road bridges on the National Register of Historic Places in Michigan
Bridges completed in 1918
Buildings and structures in Baraga County, Michigan
Transportation in Baraga County, Michigan
U.S. Route 41
National Register of Historic Places in Baraga County, Michigan
Warren truss bridges in the United States